Rhede is a municipality in the district of Borken in the state of North Rhine-Westphalia, Germany.

Notable residents
 Thomas Giessing, athlete and Olympic athlete
 Kristian Liebrand, photographer
 Michael Roes, writer
 Franz August Schmölders, Orientalist
 Ulrike Tillmann, mathematician
 Bernardo Enrique Witte, Roman Catholic bishop

References

External links
  

Towns in North Rhine-Westphalia
Borken (district)